Vagrant Bus is a 1990 Soviet drama film, filmed at the studio Lenfilm by the director Iosif Kheifits.

Story
The film tells about the artists one theater. This is a wandering troupe, which travels to his old nearly broken bus from one settlement to another, to show the audience some of his performances. Each of the artists on his love of theater, but the film also raises the problem and the material plane, for example the problem of choosing between creativity and money.

Cast
 Lev Borisov as Nicholay Tyulpanov
 Mikhail Zhigalov as Vasily
 Afanasi Trishkin as Ivan Ivanovich Daganovsky (voice Igor Dmitriev)
 Sergey Parshin as drunken farmer
 Liya Akhedzhakova as administrator Zina
 Elena Kozlitina as Olya,  mother Kostik
 Oleg Vavilov as Sergey Pavlovich
 Irina Rakshina as property master Larochka
 Valentin Bukin as bus driver Maksimych
 Galina Saburova as Verevkina
 Galina Chiginskaya as Olga, wife of Nicholay
 Lyubov Malinovskaya as cook Valya
 Alexander Lykov as the viewer in the country club
 Konstantin Mirkin as Kostik
 Nadezhda Eryomina
 Pavel Pervushin
 Vladimir Gor'kov
 Viktor Kolpakov
 Nikolai Lebedev
 Lyubov Uchaeva

Film crew
 Written by: Ludmila Razumovskaja libretto by Joseph Heifits
 Director: Joseph Kheifits
 Operator: Yuri Shaygardanov
 Artist: Vladimir Svetozarov
 Composer: Andrey Petrov
 Props and scenery: Evi Schneidman
 Sound: Igor Vigdorchik

References

External links

 Государственный регистр фильмов: Министерство Культуры Российской Федерации

1990 films
Lenfilm films
Films directed by Iosif Kheifits
Soviet drama films
1990 drama films